The NS 6000 was a series of tank engines with the wheel arrangement of 2'C2' of the Dutch Railways (NS) and its predecessor Maatschappij tot Exploitatie van Staatsspoorwegen (SS). They were manufactured by Beyer, Peacock and Company of Manchester, England.

History
Around 1912, the Maatschappij tot Exploitatie van Staatsspoorwegen had their first experience with the new and strong 2'C locomotives of the series 700, but there was a need for a tank engine version of the series 700; however, this was not possible because it would have been heavier then the maximum axle load of sixteen tons. The SS built the 2'C2' locomotives with less tractive effort than the series 700 and with only two inside cylinders, but with features quite similar to the Series 700, such as the copper-capped chimney, the copper steam dome, the wheel diameter and the maximum boiler pressure.Thus it was considered that Beyer-Peacock had built a very robust yet elegant locomotive.

Railway Operating Division
Due to the outbreak of World War I in July 1914, only 26 of the 40 locomotives ordered were delivered to the SS. The remaining 14 locomotives have been seized by the Railway Operating Division. This was part of the British War Department. The locomotives were sent to France for the benefit of the Allied armies. After the war, the Chemins de fer du Nord purchased all 14 examples which became .

Fleet list

Gallery

References

External links

Steam locomotives of the Netherlands
Rolling stock of the Netherlands
Maatschappij tot Exploitatie van Staatsspoorwegen
Beyer, Peacock locomotives
4-6-4T locomotives